Canto por travesura (Mischievous Songs) is an album recorded by Víctor Jara in 1973. It consists of a collection of southern Chilean folk songs with a consistent thematic style popular in Chilean folklore—the mocking of social norms with mischievous jokes, riddles and dark humor.

Track listing

Side one

Side two

2001 reissue bonus tracks

References

1973 albums
Víctor Jara albums